Bulla striata, commonly known as the common Atlantic bubble or striate bubble, is a species of sea snail, a marine gastropod mollusc in the family Bullidae, the bubble snails.

References

Bullidae
Gastropods described in 1792